Traiguén is a Chilean city and commune in the Malleco Province, Araucanía Region.

Demographics
Of these, 14,140 (72.4%) lived in urban areas and 5,394 (27.6%) in rural areas. Between the 1992 and 2002 censuses, the population fell by 5.3% (1,088 persons).

Administration
As a commune, Traiguén is a third-level administrative division of Chile administered by a municipal council, headed by an alcalde who is directly elected every four years. The 2012-2016 alcalde is Luis Alvarez (Ind.).And The municipal council 2012-2016 has the following members:

Ricardo Sanhueza Pirce PPD
Essio Guidotti Vallejos PPD
Eliecer Cerda Soto IND
Pablo Mena Osses PRS
Roberto Weidmann Ramirez UDI
Rosanna Rathgeb Fuentes RN

Within the electoral divisions of Chile, Traiguén is represented in the Chamber of Deputies by Gonzalo Arenas (UDI) and Mario Venegas (PDC) as part of the 48th electoral district, together with Angol, Renaico, Collipulli, Ercilla, Los Sauces, Purén and Lumaco. The commune is represented in the Senate by Alberto Espina Otero (RN) and Jaime Quintana Leal (PPD) as part of the 14th senatorial constituency (Araucanía-North).

Climate

Education
Previously the area had a German school, the Deutsche Schule Traiguén.

References

External links
  Municipality of Traiguén
 Portal web of traiguen city : www.traiguencity.cl

Communes of Chile
Populated places in Malleco Province